The Progress Party, also known as the Al-Takadum Movement or by its Arabic short form Takadum (Progress), is an Iraqi Sunni political party formed to gain political control in the 2021 general election. The party seeks to establish a civil and modern state through a cultural societal change whose components are: a conscious citizen, a modern educational system, an effective society, according to an Iraqi vision framed by the constitution and supported by the youthful that believes in change and renewal.

History 
The party was founded in 2019 by Mohamed Al Halbousi, the incumbent Speaker of the Council of Representatives of Iraq, Ali Farhan,the governor of Anbar, and the politician Yahia Al Mohamadi.

Electoral results 
In the 2021 Iraqi parliamentary election, the party made huge success, winning a total of 37 seats.

References

2019 establishments in Iraq
Liberal parties in Iraq
Nationalist parties in Iraq
Political parties established in 2019
Political parties in Iraq
Secularism in Iraq